The Battle of Riachuelo was a large and decisive naval battle of the Paraguayan War between Paraguay and the Empire of Brazil. By late 1864, Paraguay had scored a series of victories in the war, but on 11 June 1865, its naval defeat by the Brazilians on the Paraná River began to turn the tide in favor of the allies.

This was the largest naval battle fought between two South American countries.

Plan 
Paraguay's fleet was a fraction of the size of Brazil's, even before the battle, and arrived at the Fortress of Humaitá on the morning of June 9. The Paraguayan president Francisco Solano López prepared to attack the ships supporting allied land troops at Riachuelo. Nine ships and seven cannon-carrying barges, totaling 44 guns, as well as 22 guns and two Congreve rocket batteries from river bank located troops, attacked the Brazilian squadron, nine ships with a total of 58 guns.

The Paraguayans had planned a surprise attack before sunrise since they were fully aware that most Brazilian troops would offboard their steamers to sleep on land, and they would leave only a small garrison of men to guard and watch their fleet.

The original plan had been that under the dark of the night, the Paraguayan steamers would sneak up to the docked Brazilian vessels and board them outright. No confrontation other than the one carried out by the boarding party had been planned, and the Paraguayan steamers were there only to provide cover from the inland battling forces.

Battle 

[[File:Battle of Riachuelo Batalla del Riachuelo , Stage 1.png|thumb|Battle of Riachuelo, stage 1. 
a) The Brazilian fleet goes downstream to meet the Paraguayan fleet. b) Amazonas goes out of the fleet for some reason and is followed by Jequitinhonha. Then, Amazonas returns to the fleet, and Jequitinhonha is heavily attacked by the infantry and the artillery on the cliff. c）The absence of Amazonas and Jequitinhonha makes Belmonte''' become an easy target, heavily attacked, and drift downstream. d) The Brazilian fleet then turns around (keeping upstream in order to maintain the vessels' stability) while Panaiba comes to the aid of Jequitinhonha.]]

The Paraguayan fleet left the fortress of Humaitá on the night of 10 June 1865 and headed to the port of Corrientes. López had given specific orders to approach the docked Brazilian steamers stealthily before sunrise and to board them. That would leave the Brazilian ground forces bereft of their fleet early on in the war.

López sent nine steamers: Tacuarí, Ygureí, Marqués de Olinda, Paraguarí, Salto Guairá, Rio Apa, Yporá, Pirabebé, and Yberá; under the command of Captain Meza, who was aboard the Tacuarí. However, some two leagues after leaving Humaitá, it reached a point known as Nuatá-pytá, where the engine of the Yberá broke down. After hours were lost in an attempt to fix it, a decision was made to continue with only the eight remaining steamers.

The fleet arrived at Corrientes after sunrise, but because of a dense fog, the plan was still executable since most, if not all, Brazilian forces were still on land. However, not following López's orders, Meza decided that instead of approaching and boarding the docked steamers, the fleet was to continue down the river and fire at the camp and docked vessels as they passed by. The Paraguayans opened fire at 9:25 am.

The Paraguayans passed in a line parallel to the Brazilian fleet and continued downstream. Ordered by Meza, the entire fleet opened fire on the docked Brazilian steamers. The land troops, realizing that they were under attack, hastily boarded their own ships and began to return fire. One of the Paraguayan steamers was hit in the boiler, and one of the chatas (barges) was damaged as well. Once out of range, they turned upstream and anchored the barges, which formed a line in a very narrow part of the river. That was intended to trap the Brazilian fleet.

Admiral Barroso noticed the Paraguayan tactic and turned down the stream to go after the Paraguayans, but they started to fire from the shore into the lead ship, Belmonte. The second ship in the line, Jequitinhonha, mistakenly turned upstream and was followed by the whole fleet. That leaving Belmonte alone to receive the full firepower of the Paraguayan fleet, which soon put it out of action. Jequitinhonha ran aground after and so became an easy prey for the Paraguayans.

Admiral Barroso, on board the steam frigate Amazonas, tried to avoid chaos and to reorganize the Brazilian fleet and so he decided to lead the fleet downstream again and to fight the Paraguayans to prevent their escape, rather than to save Amazonas. Barroso famously rallied his fleet signalling "Brazil expects that every man will do his duty", paraphrasing Horatio Nelson.  Four steamers (Beberibe, Iguatemi, Mearim, and Araguari) followed Amazonas. Meza left his position and attacked the Brazilian line, which sent three ships after Araguari. Parnaíba remained near Jequitinhonha, and he was also attacked by three ships that were trying to board it. The Brazilian line was effectively cut into two. In Parnaíba, a ferocious battle took place when Marquez de Olinda joined the attackers.

Barroso, now heading upstream, decided to turn the tide of the battle with a desperate measure. The first ship to face Amazonas was the Paraguarí which was rammed and put out of action. Then, he rammed Marquez de Olinda and Salto, and sank a "chata". Paraguari was already out of action and so the Paraguayans tried to disengage. Beberibe and Araguari pursued the Paraguayans and heavily damaged Tacuary and Pirabebé, but nightfall prevented the sinking of those ships.Jequitinhonha had to be put afire by Paraguari and Marquez de Olinda. In the end, the Paraguayans lost four steamers and all of their "chatas", but the Brazilians lost only the Jequitinhonha, coincidentally the ship responsible for the confusion.

 Aftermath 
After the battle, the eight remaining Brazilian steamers sailed down river. President López ordered Major José María Bruguez with his batteries to quickly move inland to the south to wait for and attack the passing Brazilian fleet. The fleet then had to run the gauntlet. On August 12, Bruguez attacked the fleet from the high cliffs at Cuevas. Each Brazilian ship was hit, and 21 men were killed.

The Paraguarí, which had been rammed by the Amazonas, was set ablaze by the Brazilians, but the ship had a metal hull. A few months later, López ordered the Yporá to retrieve the hull, tow it to the Jejui River and sink it there. Also, under orders from López, one month after the battle, the Yporá returned to the scene and, again under the cover of night and using stealth to avoid alarming another Brazilian steamer nearby, boarded the remains of the Jequitinhonha and stole one of its cannons.

Meza was wounded by a gunshot to the chest on June 11 during the battle. He left the battle alive but would die eight days later from the wound at the Humaitá hospital. López, upon learning of Meza's death, said, Si no hubiera muerto con una bala, debia morir con cuatro ("Had he not died from one gunshot, he would have to die from four"). He gave orders for no officers to attend Meza's funeral.

Manuel Trujillo, one of the Paraguayan soldiers who took part in the battle, recalled, "When we sailed down river on full steam, passing all the Brazilian steamers on the morning of the eleventh, we were all shocked since we knew that all we had to do was approach the steamers and go 'all aboard!'" He also recalled that during the battle, the land troops who had been taken on the steamers to board the Brazilian fleet, shouted, "Let's approach the steamers! We came in order to board them and not to be killed on deck!"

Barroso had turned the tables by creatively ramming the enemy ships. The Brazilian Navy had won a decisive battle. General Wenceslao Robles had effectively been stopped in Rio Santa Lúcia. The threat to Argentina had been neutralized.

Order of battle
 Brazil 

 Paraguay 

Gallery

 References 
 Notes 

 Sources 
 
  – by Ulysses Narciso
 Fragoso, Augusto Tasso. História da Guerra entre a Tríplice Aliança e o Paraguai, Vol II. Rio de Janeiro: Imprensa do Estado Maior do Exército, 1934.
 Schneider, L. A guerra da tríplice Aliança, Tomo I''. São Paulo: Edições Cultura, 1945.

Naval battles of the Paraguayan War
Conflicts in 1865
Battle of Riachuelo
Maritime incidents in Argentina
History of Corrientes Province
Riverine warfare
June 1865 events